The Education Act 1962 gave local education authorities in the United Kingdom a mandate to pay the tuition of students attending full-time first degree (or comparable) courses and to provide them with a maintenance grant. No repayment was required.

Most local education authorities had already been paying students' tuition fees and providing maintenance grants since the Second World War. The Act required both, in addition to providing for discretionary tuition payments to those entering further (vocational) education instead of universities (it was expected that the industrial training boards would pay the tuition for the majority of further education students, and that few would require maintenance since they usually studied part-time). The requirement that tuition be paid and the introduction of maintenance grants on a means-tested basis led to a great increase in the number of students attending university and enabled many to attend who would not otherwise have been able to afford it. The provisions of the Act applied to students who were "ordinarily resident" in the local authority area; this was interpreted literally by the courts and in 1983 by the House of Lords, making many immigrants eligible.
The Act had a slight effect on the minimum age for leaving school by reducing to two the times during the year when a student was permitted to leave.
The Act was repealed in 1999 along with the introduction of tuition fees. State support for student maintenance is now provided by a combination of grants and loans.

References

Repealed Great Britain Acts of Parliament
Education finance in the United Kingdom
United Kingdom Education Acts